Robert Jerome "Bobby" Borchers (born June 19, 1952 in Cincinnati, Ohio) is an American country music singer.

Borchers was raised in Kentucky. He learned to play guitar at age twelve, and got his first break in the mid-1970s, when Tanya Tucker recorded his song "Jamestown Ferry." In the mid-1970s, recorded for the Playboy Records label. Borchers released two albums for Playboy: Bobby Borchers in 1977 and Denim and Rhinestones a year later. He also charted nine times within the Top 40 of the Hot Country Songs charts, including the number seven "Cheap Perfume and Candlelight" in 1977. Borchers later moved to Epic Records, where he released three singles: "Sweet Fantasy," "Wishing I Had Listened to Your Song" and "I Just Wanna Feel the Magic."

Borchers also owned the Longhorn Ballroom restaurant in Fort Wright, Kentucky in the 1980s. In 1987, he issued two singles on Longhorn Records: "It Was Love What It Was" and "(I Remember When I Thought) Whiskey Was a River."

Discography

Albums

Singles

References

1952 births
American country singer-songwriters
Epic Records artists
Musicians from Cincinnati
Living people
Singer-songwriters from Ohio
Country musicians from Ohio